Phi Sigma Gamma (PSG) is an American men's osteopathic medical fraternity. The fraternity was established in Chicago, Illinois by a merger between two previously existing osteopathic fraternities, Phi Sigma Beta and Phi Omicron Gamma, each of which had three chapters at the time. The date of the merger has been reported both as 1915 and as April 1916. A seventh chapter was added to the original six in 1917.

The sole remaining chapter of the fraternity is Zeta chapter at Philadelphia College of Osteopathic Medicine (PCOM), which is also the only fraternity remaining at PCOM.  The headquarters of PSG is located at 270 W. Walnut Lane in Philadelphia, Pennsylvania.

List of known chapters

The following is a list of chapters of the fraternity which existed as of 1920. Active chapters are noted in bold, inactive chapters are noted by italics.

Among the chapters which no longer exist, a chapter was identified as existing at the University of Health Sciences (successor to Central College of Osteopathy, and now known as the Kansas City University of Medicine and Biosciences) as of 1997, as well as a chapter at Texas A&M University in the college of Veterinary Medicine.

Zeta Chapter history

The Zeta Chapter at Philadelphia College of Osteopathic Medicine's headquarters was previously adjacent to the PCOM campus in the 1950s and 1960s on 48th Street in Philadelphia. In the academic year 1976-1977, with the support of Galen S. Young, D.O, Robert L. Meals, D.O., and John W. Becher, D.O, and the undergraduate leadership at the time, Alfred R. D'Angelo, Drake P. DeHart, Robert C. Kasprzak, Barry R. Austin, and Alan R. Maniet, a prospective new chapter house was located in the Germantown section of Philadelphia. The former Phelan Mansion had been converted into a long term care nursing facility. The building did not meet the strict codes required to exist as a nursing facility and the conversion would be too costly. The above-mentioned group negotiated to purchase the building then had to hire counsel and petition the Philadelphia Zoning Board for a change in zoning status. The efforts were successful and in the academic year 1977-1978 Phi Sigma Gamma moved into its "new" Chapter House.

Phi Chapter history
The Phi Chapter at Texas A&M University was founded by Thomas Bizzell, the son of then university president William Bennett Bizzell. The fraternity was originally formed in the academic year of 1915-1916 with president Bizzell's home in Bryan as a base of operations. In 1919, in order to protest the United States entering the great war, the order of letters was changed to form "GPS," rather than PSG. The frat continued to operate until 1941 when then freshman student Brian Michael Fitz(1922-1941) died of alcohol poisoning. After this, the university removed the fraternity's official status and the fraternity home was taken back by its original owner. The remaining students, most of whom moved into the newly built Moore residence hall are now known for the creation of Moore Hall Bonfire, and the first fraternity student bonfire crew.

Mission
The mission of Phi Sigma Gamma is to facilitate the creation and maintenance of professional, as well as social, relationships between medical students and practicing physicians.  Membership is open to all male students of Philadelphia College of Osteopathic Medicine.

References

Osteopathic medical associations
Professional medical fraternities and sororities in the United States
Student organizations established in 1915
1915 establishments in Illinois